Kandhlawi (Kāndhlawī) is a nisbat or surname derived from the name of the city of Kandhla in India.

Alternate spellings
Kandhlavi, Kandhalawi, Kandhalavi, Kandahlawi, Kandahlavi, Kandhalwi, Kandhalvi, Kandhelwi, Kandhelvi, Kandhlawee

List of persons with the name
Habibur Rahman Kandhlawi
Muhammad Idris Kandhlawi
Muhammad Yahya Kandhlawi
Muhammad Ilyas Kandhlawi
Muhammad Zakariya Kandhlawi
Muhammad Yusuf Kandhlawi
Inamul Hasan Kandhlawi
Maulana Zubair ul Hassan
Muhammad Saad Kandhlawi

Toponymic surnames
Shamli district
Indian surnames
Urdu-language surnames
People from Shamli district
Nisbas